Bernhard Hermann Neumann  (15 October 1909 – 21 October 2002) was a German-born British-Australian mathematician, who was a leader in the study of group theory.

Early life and education
After gaining a D.Phil. from Friedrich-Wilhelms Universität in Berlin in 1932 he earned a Ph.D. at the University of Cambridge in 1935 and a Doctor of Science at the University of Manchester in 1954. His doctoral students included Gilbert Baumslag, László Kovács, Michael Newman, and James Wiegold. After war service with the British Army, he became a lecturer at University College, Hull, before moving in 1948 to the University of Manchester, where he spent the next 14 years. In 1954 he received a DSc from the University of Cambridge.

In 1962 he migrated to Australia to take up the Foundation Chair of the Department of Mathematics within the Institute of Advanced Studies of the Australian National University (ANU), where he served as head of the department until retiring in 1975. In addition he was a senior research fellow at the CSIRO Division of Mathematics and Statistics from 1975 to 1977 and then honorary research fellow  from 1978 until his death in 2002.

His wife, Hanna Neumann, and sons, Peter M. Neumann and Walter Neumann, are also notable for their contributions to group theory.

He was an invited speaker of the International Congress of Mathematicians in 1936 at Oslo and in 1970 at Nice. He was elected a Fellow of the Royal Society in 1959. In 1994, he was appointed a Companion of the Order of Australia (AC).

The Australian Mathematical Society awards a student prize named in his honour. The group-theoretic notion of HNN (Higman-Neumann-Neumann) extension bears the names of Bernard and his wife Hanna, from their joint paper with Graham Higman (who later supervised the PhD of their son Peter).

Career
 Assistant lecturer, University College, Cardiff, 1937–40.
 Army Service, 1940–45.
 Lecturer, University College, Hull, (now University of Hull), 1946–48
 Lecturer, senior lecturer, reader, Manchester, 1948–61
 Professor and head of Department of Mathematics, Institute of Advanced Studies, ANU, Canberra, 1962–74; Emeritus Professor, 1975–2002.
 Senior research fellow, CSIRO Division of Mathematics and Statistics, 1975–77; honorary research fellow, 1978–99.
 Founding member of the World Cultural Council, 1981.

Awards
1984 Matthew Flinders Medal and Lecture
1952 Adams Prize, University of Cambridge

References

External links

1909 births
2002 deaths
20th-century British mathematicians
20th-century German mathematicians
Academics of Cardiff University
Academics of the University of Manchester
Australian mathematicians
Companions of the Order of Australia
Fellows of the Australian Academy of Science
Fellows of the Royal Society
Founding members of the World Cultural Council
German emigrants to Australia
Group theorists
Jewish emigrants from Nazi Germany to the United Kingdom
Academic staff of the Australian National University